The Early Parliamentary General Election Act 2019 (c. 29) was an Act of the Parliament of the United Kingdom that made legal provision for the holding of the 2019 United Kingdom general election on 12 December 2019.

The Act was fast-tracked in its passage through Parliament, meaning that it completed all of its stages in the House of Commons in a single day, on 29 October 2019, and received its formal First Reading in the House of Lords on the same day. It completed its remaining stages there on 30 October, and received royal assent, thereby becoming law, on 31 October.

The Act was a very unusual piece of constitutional legislation, as it was the first time that a United Kingdom general election had been triggered by a measure that circumvented the operation of ordinary electoral law. The ordinary law on parliamentary general elections was the Fixed-term Parliaments Act 2011 ("FTPA"), under which elections took place every five years, except that an early general election could be triggered by the House of Commons in either of two ways: a resolution supported by at least two-thirds of the total membership of the House, or a vote of no confidence in the government, when an election must be called after fourteen days unless a motion of confidence has been passed. The 2019 Act, being a new Act, required only a simple majority of the members voting in order to pass.

The Act automatically became spent upon the conclusion of the election and was repealed by the Dissolution and Calling of Parliament Act 2022 on 24 March 2022.

Background

On the weekend of 26 October 2019 the Liberal Democrats and the Scottish National Party proposed introducing a bill in the House of Commons to hold a general election on 9 December 2019. This proposal was initially rejected by the Boris Johnson government as a "gimmick", owing to a vote on an early election under the Fixed-term Parliaments Act 2011 (FTPA) which was to be held on 28 October 2019.

Two previous attempts in September to get a favourable vote for an early election had failed, and the government said it would keep its options open should the third early election motion fail to pass. It did fail, as the required two-thirds majority was not achieved, leaving the government still unable to trigger an election.

On 29 October, Prime Minister Boris Johnson introduced an election bill to the House of Commons to circumvent the FTPA and trigger a general election. Only a simple majority of MPs were needed for the Bill to pass. The election date set in the Bill was Thursday, 12 December 2019. After amendments to change the proposed date were voted down, the Commons approved the Bill by a vote of 438 to 20.

The Act

The key provisions of the Act, which contains only two sections, are section 1, subsections (1) and (2):

Although the Act referred to the FTPA, it did not amend it. Consequently, under FTPA section 1(3), following the 2019 election the next election was scheduled for the first Thursday in May (2 May) 2024.

Following the FTPA's repeal, the DCPA provides for a parliamentary term to automatically end five years after the day Parliament has first been called, if it had not been dissolved sooner, and instead called for the 2020s' first general election to be held 25 working days following the dissolution. In terms of dates, the 58th Parliament, which first met on 17 December 2019, is to be dissolved on the same day in 2024, and the next parliamentary polling day is scheduled for no later than 24 January 2025.

Outcome

Parliament was dissolved on 6 November.

The election produced an overall majority of 80 seats for the Conservative Party, led by Prime Minister Boris Johnson. The Conservatives won 365 seats, an increase of 48, while the Labour Party, led by Jeremy Corbyn, won 202, a loss of 60.  Following the result, Corbyn announced that he would stand down as Labour Party leader early in 2020.

See also
Brexit
Elections in the United Kingdom

References

External links

2019 United Kingdom general election
2019 in British law
2019 in British politics
Brexit
Election law in the United Kingdom
Repealed United Kingdom Acts of Parliament
United Kingdom Acts of Parliament 2019